403rd or 403d may refer to:

403d Bombardment Squadron, inactive United States Air Force unit
403d Operations Group, the operational flying component of the United States Air Force Reserve 403d Wing
403d Wing, unit of the United States Air Force assigned to the Air Force Reserve Command
403rd Infantry Brigade, known officially as the Peacemaker Brigade, one of the brigades of the Philippine Army

See also
403 (number)
403, the year 403 (CDIII) of the Julian calendar
403 BC